Venus Williams was the defending champion, but she didn't compete in 2003.

Elena Dementieva won the title by defeating Lindsay Davenport in the final in three sets.

Seeds

  Justine Henin (semifinals)
  Lindsay Davenport (final)
  Jennifer Capriati (semifinals)
  Daniela Hantuchová (quarterfinals)
  Jelena Dokić (third round)
  Monica Seles (quarterfinals)
  Patty Schnyder (quarterfinals)
  Amanda Coetzer (third round)
  Meghann Shaughnessy (third round)
  Elena Dementieva (winner)
  Nathalie Dechy (third round)
  Lisa Raymond (quarterfinals)
  Conchita Martínez (withdrew)
  Clarisa Fernández (third round)
  Paola Suárez (third round)
  Alexandra Stevenson (third round)

Draw

Finals

Top half

Section 1

Section 2

Bottom half

Section 3

Section 4

References

Bausch and Lomb Championships - Singles
Singles